Fiona Meryl Scott (born 1 March 1977) is an Australian politician. She was a Liberal member of the Australian House of Representatives, representing the Division of Lindsay in New South Wales from the 2013 election until the 2016 election.

Early life and education
Scott was born in Sydney and educated at Kindalin Christian School. In her senior years she went to St Paul's Grammar School and then studied at the University of Western Sydney where she graduated with a Bachelor of Business. She also holds a Master of Business Administration from the Australian Graduate School of Management (AGSM).

Career

Pre-political career

From 1997 to 1999, Scott worked in London for the International Maritime Satellite Organization (INMARSAT). She later worked as a marketing manager for the Westfield Group of companies, managing the post-acquisition, development and re-branding of Westfield Penrith. She also successfully ran her own marketing consultancy business working with both small, medium and large organisations.

Political career
Scott contested the seat of Lindsay for the first time at the 2010 federal election receiving a 5.16-point swing towards her. She contested the seat again at the 2013 federal election and won it with a two-party-preferred swing of 4.11%. Scott suffered a 4.10% swing against her at the 2016 federal election and was defeated by Emma Husar.

Post-politics 
In January 2017, Scott commenced providing political commentary on Sky News Australia featuring on PM Agenda later Speers and Paul Murray Live.

References

External links

 

1977 births
Living people
Liberal Party of Australia members of the Parliament of Australia
Politicians from Sydney
Western Sydney University alumni
Members of the Australian House of Representatives for Lindsay
Members of the Australian House of Representatives
Women members of the Australian House of Representatives
21st-century Australian politicians
21st-century Australian women politicians